Sătuc may refer to several villages:

 Sătuc, a village in Pelinei Commune, Cahul district, Moldova
 Sătuc, a village in Galbenu Commune, Brăila County, Romania
 Sătuc, a village in Berca Commune, Buzău County, Romania